Abdel Halim Ali Shabana, commonly known as Abdel Halim Hafez (June 21, 1929 – March 30, 1977), was an Egyptian singer, actor, conductor, businessman, music teacher and film producer. He is considered to be one of the greatest Egyptian musicians along with Umm Kulthum, Mohamed Abdel Wahab, Mohamed Fawzi, and Shadia. As his popularity grew, he was given the nickname 'el-Andaleeb el-Asmar, meaning The Dark-Skinned Nightingale. To date, he has sold over 80 million records.

Early life
Born Abdel Halim Ali Shabanah in El-Halawat in El Sharqia, 80 kilometers (50 miles) north of Cairo, he was the fourth child of Ali Ismail Shabanah. He had two brothers, Ismail and Mohamed, and one sister, Alyah. His mother died from labor complications three days after giving birth to him – something that made people around him believe that he brought bad luck. His father died as well a few months later, leaving him and his siblings orphaned at a young age. He lived in a poor orphanage for a number of years. He was later raised by his aunt and uncle in Cairo. During these years Abdel Halim was extremely poor.

Abdel Halim's musical abilities first became apparent while he was in primary school and his older brother Ismail Shabanah was his first music teacher. At the age of 14 he joined the Arabic Music Institute in Cairo and became known for singing the songs of Mohammed Abdel Wahab. He dropped out from the Higher Theatrical Music Institute as an oboe player.

Musical career
In the very beginning, Abdel Halim worked as a teacher of music at schools in Tanta and El-Mahalla El-Kubra. While singing in clubs in Cairo, Abdel Halim was drafted as a last-minute substitute when the singer Karem Mahmoud was unable to sing a scheduled live radio performance in 1953. Abdel Halim's performance was heard by Hafez Abdel Wahab, the supervisor of musical programming for Egyptian national radio. Abdel Halim took 'Hafez', Abdel Wahab's first name, as his stage-surname in recognition of his patronage.

In the early days of his career, Abdel Halim was rejected for his new style of singing. However he persisted and was able to gain accolades later on. Eventually, he became a singer enjoyed by all generations. He also became Egypt's first romantic singer.

In collaboration with composer Mohammed Abdel Wahab, Abdel Halim went on to produce many popular love songs such as Ahwak ("I adore you"), Nebtedi Minen el Hekaya ("Where should we start the story"), and Fatet Ganbena( "She passed by us"). Hafez also worked with Egyptian poet Mohamed Hamza on songs including Zay el Hawa ("It feels like love"), Sawah ("Wanderer"), Hawel Teftekerni ("Try to remember me"), Aye Damiet Hozn ("Any tear of sadness"), and Mawood ("Destined").

During his career, he was very popular and always performed in sold-out arenas and stadiums. Despite his popularity, he rarely released a studio album since he worked purely as a live singer. He also played many different instruments, including the oboe, drums, piano, oud, clarinet and guitar. He was involved in all aspects of the composition of his songs. Halim introduced many new instruments to the Arab World. He was known for his deep passion in his songs and his unique voice. Halim performed in almost every country in the Arab World as well as outside the Arab World, including several concerts in Europe. Moreover, he sang uplifting patriotic songs for not only his native Egypt whom he dedicated the super majority of his patriotic songs, but also there are some few songs dedicated to other countries in the Arab World such as Lebanon, Syria, Tunisia, Algeria and Morocco during their revolutions and wars. He used to encourage and help many young artists and actors to pursue successful careers. His entire catalogue was acquired by the Mazzika group in the early 2000s.

Fame
In Egypt, Halim is known as the "King of Music", "The Son of Nile", "The voice of the people", "The son of the revolution", and "King of emotions and feelings".
His patriotic songs were the most frequent songs sung by the crowds during the Egyptian Revolution of 2011. One of the revolutionaries in the Egyptian Revolution of 2011 quoted that "the nightingale's songs inspired us during the January 25 revolution", he added "Although, he died 35 years ago, his songs will surely continue to inspire his fellow Egyptians for many generations to come". His albums and CDs have sold more copies since his death than any other Arabic artist ever. His way of singing, the popularity of his songs and his behavior made him a role model for almost every modern singer in the entire region. Egyptians and also Arab people of all ages are fans of Halim. Halim is still remembered in the hearts of many people, even years after his death.

Personal life

At the age of 11, Abdel Halim contracted schistosomiasis—a rare parasitic water-borne disease—and was afflicted by it for most of his career. Despite this, he remained positive and continued composing and performing his songs.

Although Abdel Halim never married, it was rumoured that he was secretly married to actress Soad Hosni for six years. This has never been proven to date. People who were close to both singers denied this rumor.

In 1969 Halim built a hospital in Egypt. He treated the poor, the rich, and presidents equally in the Arab World.

Abdel Halim established strong friendships with many contemporary presidents and kings of the Eastern world, including Gamal Abdel Nasser of Egypt, and King Hassan II of Morocco. He also had very close friendships with most Egyptian poets.
He has been in close relation to the Nasser regime. He sang directly to the Egyptian president in several occasions. Consequently, he has been accused by many to be a "servant" of the regime.

His illness 

Abdel Halim Hafez was afflicted with cirrhosis of the liver caused by schistosomiasis, and this cirrhosis was the cause of his death in 1977 AD. He knew about this disease for the first time in 1956 AD when he was invited to have dinner with his friend Mustafa Al-Areef during the Holy month of Ramadan by where he had stomach bleeding.

Doctors who treated him during his illness journey are Dr. Mustafa Kenawy, Dr. Yassin Abdel Ghaffar, Dr. Zaki Sweidan, Dr. Hisham Issa, Dr. Shaker Sorour, and from England Dr. Tanner, Dr. Sheila Sherlock, Dr. Doger Williams, Dr. Ronald Macbeth, and from France Dr. Sarazan.

He had a private secretary, Miss Suhair Muhammad Ali, and she worked with him since 1972, and she accompanied him in all the hospitals where he stayed.

Hospitals where he was stayed abroad: Ibn Sina Hospital in Rabat (Morocco), St. James Hearst Hospital, London Clinic, Fersing Home, Kings College Hospital (the hospital that witnessed his death) in England, and  “Salpetrade” in ( Paris).

Death

Abdel Halim died of liver failure as a complication from Schistosoma mansoni (reference St. George's University School of Medicine) on March 30, 1977 (a few months before his 48th birthday) while undergoing treatment for Bilharzia in King's College Hospital, London. His funeral in Cairo was attended by millions of people – more than any funeral in the history of the Middle East, other than that of President Nasser. Halim was reported to have had many more dreams and goals that he wanted to achieve, though his early death prevented him from doing so. In the wake of Halim's passing, it was documented people committed suicide, including  at least four women committing suicide by jumping off a balcony during his funeral march. He was buried in Al Bassatin Cemetery in Cairo.

Legacy
Abdel Halim Hafez's song "Khosara" received notice in the Western world in 1999 when elements from it were used for Jay-Z's recording "Big Pimpin'." Two complete bars from "Khosara" were rerecorded, not sampled, and used without permission from the song's producer and copyright holder, Magdi el-Amroussi. Jay-Z's use of an interpolation, rather than an actual sample, allowed him to avoid paying royalties for the use of the song.

Over 300 of Abdel Halim Hafez's songs were recorded and he starred in 16 classic and successful films, including Dalilah, which was the Middle East's first color motion picture.

Along with Mohammed Abdel Wahab and Magdi el-Amroussi, Abdel Halim was one of the main founders of the Egyptian recording company Soutelphan, which continues to operate to this day as a subsidiary of Mazzika

A feature film about his life, "Haleem", was released in 2006, starring Ahmad Zaki in the title role, produced by the Good News Group. In the same year a soap opera "Al-andaleeb hikayt shaab" was produced in Egypt with Shadi Shamel starring as Abdel Halim. Shamel won the lead role in a televised competition.

On 21 June 2011, Google celebrated his 82nd birthday with a Google Doodle.

On 19 April 2019, Lebanese singer Carole Samaha performed alongside a hologram of Abdel Halim Hafez at the Manara Hall in New Cairo. The concert, titled "Helm" (dream), was Egypt's first hologram concert.

Songs
Some of Halim's most popular songs are:

"Ahwak" (I adore you),
"Ala Ad El Sho'" (As much as the longing),
"Ala Hesb Wedad" (Wherever my heart leads me),
"Betlomooni Leih" (Why do you blame me),
"El Massih" (Christ),
"Fatet Ganbena" (She passed by us),
"Gabbar" (Arrogant),
"Gana El Hawa" (The mood struck us),
"Sawwah" (Wanderer),
"Maw'ood" (Destined),
"Zai El Hawa" (Like love),
"Qari'at Al Fingan" (The coffee fortune-teller), his last song while alive
"Habibati Man-Takoon" (My Love, Who Is She), released posthumously

Patriotic Songs
"The New Testament" in 1952, the first national anthem sung by Abdel Halim Hafez in his life, written by Mahmoud Abdel Hai and composed by Abdel Hamid Tawfiq Zaki, and Abdel Halim sang it after the July 23 revolution.
"We are the people" is the first song that Abdel Halim sang to President Gamal Abdel Nasser after he was chosen to be President of the Republic in 1956. It is the first meeting between the trio Abdel Halim, the analyst Kamal Al-Taweel and the poet Salah Jahin.
"God, our country" is the first cooperation between Mohamed Abdel-Wahaband  Abdel Halim in the field of patriotic songs in 1956. Abdel Halim sang after the tripartite aggression.
“On its Land” or “Christ’s Song” is about Jerusalem, written by  Abdel Rahman Al-Abnoudi, composed by Baligh Hamdi and distributed by Ali Ismail.
"Your Son Says You Hero" written by  Abdul Rahman Al-Abnoudi, and composed by Kamal Al-Taweel.
“The Greater Homeland Anthem” in 1960 written by Ahmed Shafiq Kamel and composed by Mohamed Abdel Wahab.
“The Story of a People” in 1960 written by Ahmed Shafiq Kamel and composed by Kamal Al-Taweel, in the “Adwaa Al-Madina” party that was held in Aswan to celebrate the laying of the foundation stone for the construction of the High Dam.
"Matalib Shaab"  on the occasion of the tenth anniversary of the revolution, July 23, 1962, written b Ahmed Shafiq Kamel, composed by Kamal Al-Taweel and distributed by Ali Ismail.
"Sourah" he sang on Revolution Day on July 23, 1966, written by Salah Jaheen and composed by Kamal Al-Taweel.
"Aadah Al-Nahar" in 1967, and it is one of the most prominent songs of Abdel Halim, written by Abdel Rahman Al-Abnoudi and composed by Baligh Hamdi.
"I swear by its name" in 1967, which Abdel Halim promised to sing in all his concerts until the land of Egypt is liberated in the Sinai, written by of Abdel Rahman Al-Abnoudi and composed by Kamal Al-Taweel.
“The Gun  Talk” in 1968, written by of Abdul Rahman Al-Abnoudi and composed by Kamal Al-Taweel.
"Aash lih Aal" is the first song which was sung by Abdel Halim after 1973 October Victory, written by Mohamed Hamza and composed by Baligh Hamdi;it was the first song in which he praised the role of President Mohamed Anwar Sadat in the great victory of Egypt.
"Good morning, Sina" is another cooperation between Abdel Halim and Kamal Al-Taweel in 1974.
“al nejmah malet ala amar” 1975, written by Mohsen Al-Khayat and composed by Muhammad Al-Mouji,
“The Boat is Back” written by f Mustafa Al-Damrani and composed by Muhammad Abdel Wahab after the reopening of the Suez Canal for global navigation.

Religious Invocations

"Nafadet Einayah Almanamm" (My eyes shook the dream)
"Ana min al tourab" (I am from dust)
"Ala Toutah" (On the raspberry)
"Adaaouka Ya Samaah" (I call you,Listener)
"Wa Rahmatoka fi Nasim" (And your mercy in the breeze")
"Bayneh wa Bayn Al nas" (Between me and the people)
"Wa Habeh fih Al-ared" (And the grain in the earth)
"Khalineh Kelmah" (Let me a word)
"Waraa Al shajar" (Tree leaves)
"Bayna Sohbat Al Ward" (Among the company of Roses)
"Ya Khalek Alward" (The Creator of the flowers)
All of theses religious invocations were written by the poet Abdel-Fattah Mustafa, and composed by Muhammad Al-Mouji.

Filmography

References

External links
 
 
 Abdel Halim Hafez at krwetatnt.net
 Abdel Halim Hafez Love Songs Lyrics | Video
 

1929 births
1977 deaths
20th-century Egyptian male singers
Egyptian male film actors
People from Sharqia Governorate
Burials in Egypt
Deaths from liver failure
EMI Classics and Virgin Classics artists
Singers who perform in Egyptian Arabic
20th-century Egyptian male actors
Singers who perform in Classical Arabic